Thomas E. Lubnau II (born December 12, 1958), is an American politician and lawyer who served as Speaker of the Wyoming House of Representatives from 2013 to 2015. He served District 31 as a representative in the House from 2005 to 2015 as a member of the Republican Party.

Early career
Lubnau served as president of the Wyoming State Bar in 2002 – 2003. Prior to that, he was president-elect (2001–2002), vice-president (2000–2001) and bar commissioner (1997–2000).

Tenure in Wyoming House
Prior to his speakership, Lubnau was the House Speaker Pro Tempore in 2007 and 2008 and the House Majority Leader in 2011 and 2012. He is a graduate of the University of Wyoming in his native Laramie, with both bachelor's and Juris Doctor degrees in 1981 and 1984, respectively. He is affiliated with Rotary International. Lubnau and his wife, Rita, have two children. He is Episcopalian.

Lubnau is the first House Speaker from Campbell County since Republican Cliff H. Davis, who served in 1973 and 1974.

In the summer of 2013, Lubnau called for a still pending investigation into allegations that Cindy Hill, a fellow Republican, but with Tea Party movement support, had misused her office as state superintendent of public instruction and created a "pillow fort." The investigating committee could recommend that the full House launch impeachment proceedings against Hill. Were impeachment approved, Hill would, if convicted in an impeachment trial in the Wyoming Senate, be required to vacate her position. No deadline has been set for the committee to complete its work.

References

1958 births
Living people
University of Wyoming alumni
Speakers of the Wyoming House of Representatives
Republican Party members of the Wyoming House of Representatives
Wyoming lawyers
Politicians from Laramie, Wyoming
People from Gillette, Wyoming
21st-century American politicians
20th-century American lawyers
21st-century American lawyers